Several jurisdictions in the United States have banned conversion therapy, the pseudoscientific practice of attempting to change an individual's sexual orientation or gender identity using psychological or spiritual interventions. A total of 25 states, as well as the District of Columbia, Puerto Rico, and 100 municipalities (mostly located in Florida, Ohio, Pennsylvania, Wisconsin, Michigan, and Minnesota), have banned the practice of conversion therapy on minors. Penalties range from fines to imprisonment. The District of Columbia is the only U.S. jurisdiction whose ban also applies to adults. Three states ban the use of state and federal funds for conversion therapy on minors. In some jurisdictions, bans on conversion therapy have been enjoined on First Amendment grounds.

The Trevor Project's Protecting with Pride Campaign is the largest movement in the world endeavoring to protect LGBTQ young people from harmful sexual orientation and gender identity change efforts in every state of the nation and countries around the world.



States

Territories

Counties, municipalities and communities

School boards

Failed legislation

Minnesota
On April 25, 2019, the Minnesota House of Representatives voted to incorporate HF 12, which would ban conversion therapy on minors, into the omnibus health and human services finance bill HF 2414 by a vote of 72–53. On April 30, 2019, the Minnesota Senate voted to strike the section by a vote of 34–30.

In July 2021, an executive order was signed and implemented to ban conversion therapy within Minnesota.

Medical, psychological and psychiatric organizations
Despite the lack of federal legislation regarding bans on conversion therapy, such therapy has been banned by numerous therapy organizations operating in the U.S. It has been banned by the American Psychiatric Association since 1998. In 2009, conversion therapy was also rebuked by the American Psychological Association. Others include the American Academy of Child and Adolescent Psychiatry, the American Academy of Pediatrics, the American Medical Association, the American College of Physicians, the American Academy of Physician Assistants, and many more. Organizations such as GLAAD and Human Rights Campaign have acknowledged that several other psychiatric and psychological organizations in the United States have rejected the practice of conversion therapy as well.

Resolutions and proclamations
As of February 2021, fourteen cities/counties have passed non-binding resolutions or proclamations declaring opposition to conversion therapy. These are Edgewater, Colorado; Westminster, Colorado; Wheat Ridge, Colorado; Indianapolis, Indiana; Atlanta, Georgia; Worcester, Massachusetts; Columbia, Missouri; Suffolk County, New York; Harrisburg, Pennsylvania; Appleton, Wisconsin; Eau Claire County, Wisconsin; Richmond, Virginia; Rochester, Minnesota; and Shorewood, Wisconsin.

See also

 Sexual orientation change efforts
LGBT rights in the United States
LGBT rights by country or territory

Notes

References

Conversion therapy
LGBT rights in the United States